Bård is a Norwegian masculine given name. It is a Norwegian form of the Old Norse name Bárðr. Sometimes it also appears as a surname. It may refer to:

Given name 
 Bård Borgersen (born 1972), Norwegian football player
 Bård Breien (born 1971), Norwegian film director
 Bård Breivik (1948–2016), Norwegian sculptor
 Bård "Faust" Eithun (born 1974), Norwegian drummer
 Bård Eker (born 1961), Norwegian industrial designer and entrepreneur
 Bård Jørgen Elden (born 1968), Norwegian Nordic combined skier
 Bård Finne (born 1995), Norwegian football player
 Bård Hoksrud (born 1973), Norwegian politician
 Bård Tufte Johansen (born 1969), Norwegian comedian
 Bård Kvalheim (born 1973), Norwegian middle-distance runner
 Bård Lahn (born 1983), Norwegian environmentalist
 Bård Aasen Lødemel (born 1976), Norwegian DJ and music producer known professionally as Skatebård
 Bård Løken (born 1964), Norwegian photographer
 Bård Mikkelsen (born 1948), Norwegian businessperson
 Bård Nesteng (born 1979), Norwegian archer
 Bård Øistensen (born 1951), Norwegian civil servant
 Bård Vegar Solhjell (born 1971), Norwegian politician
 Bård Tønder (born 1948), Norwegian judge
 Bård Torstensen (born 1961), Norwegian guitarist and record producer
 Bård Vonen (born 1955), Norwegian fencer
Bård Ylvisåker (born 1982), Norwegian comedian

Surname 
 Anna Bård (born 1980), Danish actress and model

References 

Norwegian masculine given names